The 1913 Grand National was the 75th renewal of the Grand National horse race that took place at Aintree near Liverpool, England, in 1913.

Owner Sir Charles Assheton-Smith also provided the winner in 1912, and had done so many years earlier,
in 1893, when he was simply known as Charles Duff.

Finishing Order

Non-finishers

References

 1913
Grand National
Grand National
20th century in Lancashire